Thermalito (Spanish for "Small Thermal") is a census-designated place (CDP) in Butte County, California, United States. The population was 6,646 at the 2010 census, up from 6,045 at the 2000 census. The area is generally considered an integral part of Oroville, and borders the town on two sides, in addition to the near-enclave of the city of Oroville surrounded by Thermalito on all sides, with the exception of the extremely narrow spit of land connecting Afterbay to Oroville proper.

Geography

Climate
According to the Köppen Climate Classification system, Thermalito has a warm-summer Mediterranean climate, abbreviated "Csa" on climate maps.

Thermalito trail 
The Thermalito Trail is a trail located in Thermalito. It passes through the Kilkare Canyon.

History
A post office operated in Thermalito from 1895 to 1920.

Demographics

2010
At the 2010 census Thermalito had a population of 6,646. The racial makeup of Thermalito was 4,594 (69.1%) White, 61 (0.9%) African American, 257 (3.9%) Native American, 1,102 (16.6%) Asian, 37 (0.6%) Pacific Islander, 270 (4.1%) from other races, and 325 (4.9%) from two or more races. Hispanic or Latino of any race were 713 people (10.7%).

The census reported that 6,556 people (98.6% of the population) lived in households, 52 (0.8%) lived in non-institutionalized group quarters, and 38 (0.6%) were institutionalized.

There were 2,263 households, 794 (35.1%) had children under the age of 18 living in them, 1,038 (45.9%) were opposite-sex married couples living together, 332 (14.7%) had a female householder with no husband present, 190 (8.4%) had a male householder with no wife present.  There were 190 (8.4%) unmarried opposite-sex partnerships, and 12 (0.5%) same-sex married couples or partnerships. 550 households (24.3%) were one person and 246 (10.9%) had someone living alone who was 65 or older. The average household size was 2.90.  There were 1,560 families (68.9% of households); the average family size was 3.44.

The age distribution was 1,748 people (26.3%) under the age of 18, 691 people (10.4%) aged 18 to 24, 1,458 people (21.9%) aged 25 to 44, 1,754 people (26.4%) aged 45 to 64, and 995 people (15.0%) who were 65 or older.  The median age was 37.0 years. For every 100 females, there were 100.4 males.  For every 100 females age 18 and over, there were 98.9 males.

There were 2,447 housing units at an average density of ,of which 2,263 were occupied, 1,522 (67.3%) by the owners and 741 (32.7%) by renters.  The homeowner vacancy rate was 3.2%; the rental vacancy rate was 5.7%.  4,227 people (63.6% of the population) lived in owner-occupied housing units and 2,329 people (35.0%) lived in rental housing units.

2000
At the 2000 census there were 6,045 people, 2,143 households, and 1,508 families in the CDP. The racial makeup of the CDP was 77.73% White, 0.46% Black or African American, 2.91% Native American, 10.50% Asian, 0.20% Pacific Islander, 2.98% from other races, and 5.21% from two or more races.  7.69% of the population were Hispanic or Latino of any race.
Of the 2,143 households 30.2% had children under the age of 18 living with them, 50.4% were married couples living together, 14.7% had a female householder with no husband present, and 29.6% were non-families. 24.4% of households were one person and 11.6% were one person aged 65 or older.  The average household size was 2.79 and the average family size was 3.31.

The age distribution was 30.1% under the age of 18, 7.4% from 18 to 24, 23.4% from 25 to 44, 23.8% from 45 to 64, and 15.3% 65 or older.  The median age was 37 years. For every 100 females, there were 93.4 males.  For every 100 females age 18 and over, there were 91.3 males.

The median household income was $26,760 and the median family income  was $29,388. Males had a median income of $31,123 versus $24,208 for females. The per capita income for the CDP was $11,819.  About 20.2% of families and 27.9% of the population were below the poverty line, including 45.8% of those under age 18 and 16.7% of those age 65 or over.

Most high school students in Thermalito attend Oroville High School.

See also
 Oroville-Thermalito Complex

References

Census-designated places in Butte County, California
Census-designated places in California
1895 establishments in California